Naïma Moreira-Laliberté (born October 30, 1996) is a Canadian Equestrian Team athlete in dressage. She is reigning Pan American Games champion in team dressage, when she won gold in 2019 in Lima with Jill Irving, Tina Irwin, and Lindsay Kellock. Moreira-Laliberté was born in Montreal and grew up in Outremont, Quebec.

She is the daughter of Canadian businessman Guy Laliberté.

References

1996 births
Canadian female equestrians
Canadian dressage riders
Living people
Equestrians at the 2019 Pan American Games
Sportspeople from Montreal
Pan American Games gold medalists for Canada
Pan American Games medalists in equestrian
Medalists at the 2019 Pan American Games